Mermaid's Pool may refer to:

 Mermaid's Pool (Peak District), a tarn in the moors of Derbyshire, England
 Mermaid's Pool (Devon), a pool on the shore platform in Devon, England

See also 
 Mermaid Pool, in Manly Vale, Sydney, Australia
 Mermaid Pool, in Matapouri, New Zealand
 Mermaid's Pond, a small lake in Staffordshire, England
 Mermaid Waters, Queensland, a suburb in Australia